Mad River (formerly Kuntz) is a census-designated place (CDP) in Trinity County, California. Mad River is located in the southern part of the county. The ZIP Code is 95552. Its population is 361 as of the 2020 census, down from 420 from the 2010 census.

Its post office serves itself and the communities of Dinsmore (Humboldt County), and Van Duzen; both using 95552 as their ZIP code. Ruth residents with Post Office Boxes at the Ruth Store share the 95526 zip code with Bridgeville. Starting in the Spring of 2014, Ruth residents with mail boxes on the Mad River Road are now part of the Mad River zip code and use the city designation of Mad River, CA 95552. Mad River is home to Southern Trinity High School, the region's only high school, with an enrollment of 45 students. It is also home to Van Duzen Elementary School.

History
The stream was named in December 1849 by the Gregg Party. Myth has it that the leader of the party, in apparent anger with fellow companions over latitude positioning, coined the term when comparing the experience of the difficult exchange between his peers.

At the 2000 census, Mad River constituted a census county division (CCD). The population was 838 at the 2000 census. Most of the former CCD is covered by the Six Rivers National Forest and the Shasta-Trinity National Forest. Mad River itself is near the western extent of Ruth Lake, the major water reservoir for the populated area around Humboldt Bay within Humboldt County located to the northwest.

Communities within the former CCD

Most of the communities that encompass the former Mad River CCD are off main highways and at least  from a major city. The area code for most of the region is 707, because phone service comes from larger communities in Humboldt County, such as Bridgeville or Garberville.

Mad River
It is home to Ruth Lake, a long narrow lake primarily used to control flow of water in the Mad River to supply the Humboldt Bay area with drinking water and water for industrial activities. The lake is also used for recreation, irrigation, and hydroelectric power. It has two stores and gas stations and a church.
It has a U.S. Forest Service Fire station, and a store that is now closed. Mail and telephone service is from Hayfork. Its former ZIP code is 96030.

Creeks, lakes, rivers, and streams
Watts Lake (small pond)
Ruth Lake
Horse Ranch Lake (small pond)
Mud Lake (small pond)
Antone Lake (pond)
Minnie Lake (pond)
Henthorne Lake (pond)
Turtle Lake (pond)
Lily Lake (pond)
Yew Wood Creek
Anada Creek
Alder Basin Creek
Lamb Creek
Littlefield Creek
Barry Creek
Minnie Creek
North Fork/Middle Fork Eel River
North Fork Mud River
Maynard Creek
Olsen Creek
South Fork Trinity River

Geography 
According to the United States Census Bureau, the CCD has a total area of 155.6 square miles (830.8 km2) all land.

Demographics 
As of the census of 2000, there were 838 people and 433 families residing in the CCD.  The population density was 0.4/km2 (1/mi2).  The racial makeup of the CCD was 86.8% White, 0% African American, 0% Native American, 0% Asian, 8.9% from other races, and 4.3% from two or more races. Hispanic or Latino of any race were 2.1% of the population.

Geography
According to the United States Census Bureau, the CDP covers an area of 34.65 square miles (89.75 km2), all of it land.

Climate
This area experiences hot summers and mild winters. According to the Köppen Climate Classification system, Mad River has a warm-summer Mediterranean climate, abbreviated "Csb" on climate maps.

Demographics
The 2010 United States Census reported that Mad River had a population of 420. The population density was 12.1 people per square mile (4.7/km2). The racial makeup of Mad River was 383 (91.2%) White, 1 (0.2%) African American, 11 (2.6%) Native American, 1 (0.2%) Asian, 0 (0.0%) Pacific Islander, 7 (1.7%) from other races, and 17 (4.0%) from two or more races.  Hispanic or Latino of any race were 21 persons (5.0%).

The Census reported that 420 people (100% of the population) lived in households, 0 (0%) lived in non-institutionalized group quarters, and 0 (0%) were institutionalized.

There were 198 households, out of which 40 (20.2%) had children under the age of 18 living in them, 82 (41.4%) were opposite-sex married couples living together, 20 (10.1%) had a female householder with no husband present, 7 (3.5%) had a male householder with no wife present.  There were 15 (7.6%) unmarried opposite-sex partnerships, and 2 (1.0%) same-sex married couples or partnerships. 71 households (35.9%) were made up of individuals, and 16 (8.1%) had someone living alone who was 65 years of age or older. The average household size was 2.12.  There were 109 families (55.1% of all households); the average family size was 2.72.

The population was spread out, with 76 people (18.1%) under the age of 18, 17 people (4.0%) aged 18 to 24, 85 people (20.2%) aged 25 to 44, 175 people (41.7%) aged 45 to 64, and 67 people (16.0%) who were 65 years of age or older.  The median age was 50.0 years. For every 100 females, there were 117.6 males.  For every 100 females age 18 and over, there were 124.8 males.

There were 347 housing units at an average density of 10.0 per square mile (3.9/km2), of which 127 (64.1%) were owner-occupied, and 71 (35.9%) were occupied by renters. The homeowner vacancy rate was 1.6%; the rental vacancy rate was 10.0%.  269 people (64.0% of the population) lived in owner-occupied housing units and 151 people (36.0%) lived in rental housing units.

Politics

References

External links

 

Census-designated places in Trinity County, California
Census-designated places in California